Lunz may refer to:

 Christopher Lunz
 Gerald Lunz, television producer and spouse of Rick Mercer
 Jerry Lunz (1903-?), American football player
 Lunz Formation, a geologic formation in Austria
 Lunz am See, Lower Austria, Austria

See also
 Luntz, a surname